Benafarces is a municipality located in the province of Valladolid, Castile and León, Spain. According to the 2004 census (INE), the municipality had a population of 114 inhabitants.

In 1147 Osorio Martínez granted a fuero to Benafarces with the approval of Alfonso VII. The village in turn was required to make an annual payment in kind of half a sheep, ten loaves of bread, some barley, and some must.

Notes

Municipalities in the Province of Valladolid